Mark Young is an American former professional basketball player. He played college basketball for the Fairfield Stags.

High school career
Young attended Brookline High School in Brookline, Massachusetts. As a senior, he was named New England's Athlete of the Year, while averaging 30.9 points and 18 rebounds per game. He finished his high school career with over 1,500 points and set a single-game school record with 42 points scored.

College career
Young accepted a basketball scholarship from Fairfield University, over Duke University and the College of the Holy Cross, to play under head coach Fred Barakat. He was a teammate of Joe DeSantis and became a four-year starter at center. As a sophomore, he contributed to the team having a 13-0 record at home. He tallied 19 rebounds against Merrimack College.

As a junior, he ranked sixth nationally in field goal percentage (.629), which was also a New England record, after making 149 of 237 attempts. He averaged 17.1 points and 7.4 rebounds per contest. His best game came against the University of Dayton in the 1978 National Invitation Tournament, where he scored 32 points.

As a senior, he led the Stags in scoring (20.9) and rebounding (9.0), while setting a school single-season record with 193 free throws made and becoming the fifth player in school history to surpass 800 career rebounds. 

Young left school as the second all-time leading scorer (1,643 points), fifth in rebounds (808), third in field goal percentage (.558), holding Fairfield records in free throws made (543) and attempted (697). He played in 106 games and scored over 30 points in five of those contests. 

In 1985, he was inducted as a member of the Fairfield Athletic Hall of Fame. In 2017, he was named to the Metro Atlantic Athletic Conference (MAAC) Honor Roll.

Professional career
Young was selected by the Los Angeles Lakers in the second round (41st overall) of the 1979 NBA draft. He was released before the start of the season and never played in the National Basketball Association (NBA). He played in Europe during the 1979–80 season. Young signed with Maccabi Haifa B.C. of the Israeli Basketball Premier League in 1981.

Career statistics

College

|-
| style="text-align:left;"| 1975–76
| style="text-align:left;"| Fairfield
| 26 || – || – || .509 || – || .696 || 7.0 || .5 || – || – || 11.0
|-
| style="text-align:left;"| 1976–77
| style="text-align:left;"| Fairfield
| 27 || – || – || .494 || – || .744 || 7.2 || .3 || – || – || 13.0
|-
| style="text-align:left;"| 1977–78
| style="text-align:left;"| Fairfield
| 27 || – || – || .629 || – || .811 || 7.4 || .4 || – || – || 17.1
|-
| style="text-align:left;"| 1978–79
| style="text-align:left;"| Fairfield
| 26 || – || – || .587 || – || .811 || 9.0 || 1.0 || – || – || 20.9
|- class="sortbottom"
| style="text-align:center;" colspan="2"| Career
| 106 || – || – || .558 || – || .779 || 7.6 || .5 || – || – || 15.5

References

External links
College statistics

Year of birth missing (living people)
Living people
American men's basketball players
Basketball players from Massachusetts
Centers (basketball)
Fairfield Stags men's basketball players
Los Angeles Lakers draft picks
Maccabi Haifa B.C. players
Sportspeople from Newton, Massachusetts